RSV Media Center is a broadcasting company in Belize established on February 14, 1993.

History 

The Center has been headed by Rene Villanueva Sr. for all of its existence. RSV Limited is the Parent Company of Belize's largest Radio Station LOVE FM. LOVE FM is the only nationwide broadcasting system in Belize. It operates repeaters in every district town of Belize. It was inaugurated on February 14, 1993. Its slogan is News and Music Power. Six months after coming on air a University Survey found that it had 49.5 percent of the listening audience. An independent survey by British Forces showed that 66.6 percent of Belizeans relied on LOVE FM during emergencies. The station assisted during hurricanes Mitch, Keith, Chantal and Iris.

Estereo Amor was founded on February 14, 1994 and is currently the only Spanish-language radio station operating in the country. Its signal, which also originates in Belize City, is also heard via repeaters in Central, Western and Northern Belize.

A third station aimed at young people, MORE FM, was inaugurated on February 14, 2000. It is geared towards adolescents and young adults and plays mostly newer genres of music. MORE FM was located in Belmopan for its first three years, then moved to Belize City. It reached Central and Western Belize and was to be expanded to cover Southern Belize.

Love Belize Television also operates from the Media Center in Belize City and at this time is on Cable in Belize City and neighboring Villages. Plans are underway to upgrade its coverage and programming.

Entities that are part of RSV Media Center 
 LOVE FM (radio station)
 More FM (radio station)
 Estereo Amor (Spanish radio station)
 LOVE Television (TV station)

References

External links 
 LOVE FM Web site 
 Estereo Amor Web site 

 
1993 establishments in Belize
Companies established in 1993